It's Our Thing is the sixth album released by The Isley Brothers on their own T-Neck Records imprint on April 26, 1969. Fully emancipated from three and a half years in Motown Records and encouraged by their international success in the United Kingdom, the Isleys composed this album in the style of Sly & the Family Stone/James Brown funk that was dominating the music industry at the time but with their own flair as explained in their smash "It's Your Thing". Other hits off the album though it didn't chart included "I Know Who You Been Socking It To" and "Give the Women What They Want". This album was also the Isleys' first Top 40 record reaching #22 on the pop albums chart. Curiously, despite its importance in the career of the seminal group, this album was not released in CD format until 2008. The album was remastered and expanded for inclusion in the 2015 released CD box set "The RCA Victor & T-Neck Album Masters, 1959-1983". Although not featured on the album's cover, It's Our Thing marks the first Isley Brothers album to feature Ernie Isley on bass guitar.

Track listing

Personnel
The Isley Brothers
Ronald Isley – lead vocals
O'Kelly Isley, Jr. and Rudolph Isley – background vocals
Everett Collins – drums, percusion
Ernie Isley – bass, guitar

with
Instrumentation by assorted New York City musicians

Technical
Tony May – recording and mix engineer
Acy R. Lehman – art direction
James Kriegsmann Jr. – cover photography

References

External links
 The Isley Brothers - It's Our Thing (1969) album review by Alex Henderson, credits & releases at AllMusic
 The Isley Brothers - It's Our Thing (1969) album releases & credits at Discogs
 The Isley Brothers - It's Our Thing (1969) album to be listened as stream on Spotify
 The Isley Brothers - It's Our Thing (1969) album back cover at www.FunkMySoul.gr

1969 albums
The Isley Brothers albums
Buddah Records albums
T-Neck Records albums
Albums produced by Rudolph Isley
Albums produced by Ronald Isley